Bury may refer to:
The burial of human remains
-bury, a suffix in English placenames

Places

England
 Bury, Cambridgeshire, a village
 Bury, Greater Manchester, a town, historically in Lancashire
 Bury (UK Parliament constituency) (1832–1950) 
Bury and Radcliffe (UK Parliament constituency) (1950–1983)
Bury North (UK Parliament constituency), from 1983
Bury South (UK Parliament constituency), from 1983
 County Borough of Bury, 1846–1974
 Metropolitan Borough of Bury, from 1974
 Bury Rural District, 1894–1933
 Bury, Somerset, a hamlet
 Bury, West Sussex, a village and civil parish
 Bury (UK electoral ward)
 Bury St Edmunds, a town in Suffolk, commonly referred to as Bury
 New Bury, a suburb of Farnworth in the Bolton district of Greater Manchester

Elsewhere
 Bury, Hainaut, Belgium, a village in the commune of Péruwelz, Wallonia
 Bury, Quebec, Canada, a municipality
 Bury, Oise, France, a commune

Sports
 Bury (professional wrestling), a slang term used in the world of wrestling
 Bury F.C., a professional football team in Bury, northern England
 Bury Town F.C., a football team from Bury St Edmunds, south-east England

Other uses
 Bury (surname)
 Bury (The Fall song)
 , a Royal Navy First World War minesweeper
 Horace Bury, a character in the science fiction novel The Mote in God's Eye

See also
Bury, Curtis and Kennedy, British locomotive builder